Manoeuvres is the second and final solo studio album by English musician Greg Lake.  It was released in July 1983 by Chrysalis Records and featured his 1981 to 1983 lineup (with guitarist Gary Moore, longtime friend bassist Tris Margetts, drummer Ted McKenna (The Sensational Alex Harvey Band; Rory Gallagher), and session keyboardist Tommy Eyre),. 

Like his debut solo album, Greg Lake (1981), Manoeuvres was created in close collaboration with Northern Irish guitarist and singer-songwriter Gary Moore. It includes a song "Haunted" written with friend and bassist Tris Margetts and rock cartoonist-artist Tony Benyon.

The album features a pop-flavoured progressive rock sound resembling that of Asia, the group Lake would join briefly in the end of 1983. Manoeuvres received mainly negative reviews at the time and failed to match the sales of its predecessor.  

In his autobiography Lake says that "there was no tour and virtually no promotion", and that he recognised that the public did not want guitar-oriented music from him.  He parted company with Chrysalis.  The album would be Lake's last studio album as a solo artist.

Later work by Greg Lake 

His "Songs of a Lifetime" tour in 2012 produced a 2013 live album of the same name, and his 2012 solo concert live in Piacenza, Italy (where he was awarded an honorary doctorate by the University of Piacenza) also produced a live album "Live In Piacenza" released in 2017.

His other work consisted of collaborations and concerts with artists including Ringo Starr & His All-Starr Band; The Who; Ian Anderson; The RD Crusaders and Roger Daltrey (benefiting the Teenage Cancer Trust); his solo projects supporting the National Center for Missing & Exploited Children, the Sara Anne Wood Rescue Center, the Society for the Prevention of Cruelty to Animals, and other organizations, and periodic reunions with Emerson, Lake & Palmer.

Track listing

Personnel
Greg Lake – vocals, guitars
Gary Moore – guitars
Tommy Eyre – keyboards
Tristram "Tris" Margetts – bass
Ted McKenna – drums

Technical personnel
Dan Priest – mix and overdub engineer (at Magritte Studios)
Andy Pearce – 2010 remastering
Robin Harris – illustrations
John Pasche – design

References

Greg Lake albums
1983 albums
Progressive rock albums by English artists
Chrysalis Records albums
Albums produced by Greg Lake